Richard Kuremaa (12 January 1912 – 10 January 1991) was an Estonian footballer - one of the most famous before World War II. He played 42 times for Estonia national football team scoring 19 goals. He debuted on 11 June 1933 in game versus Sweden. Until 1995 he was the all-time top scorer in Estonian premier division with 65 goals, but he never won the top scorer award.

Club career statistics

References 
Profile on ESBL

1912 births
1991 deaths
Footballers from Tallinn
People from the Governorate of Estonia
Estonian footballers
Estonia international footballers
Association football forwards
JK Tervis Pärnu players
Soviet military personnel of World War II
Estonian prisoners of war
World War II prisoners of war held by Germany